Manu Koch (born June 12, 1972, in Baar, Switzerland) is a Swiss pianist, keyboardist and composer.

Life and career 

Koch studied classical piano from age 6 and started tenor saxophone at age 18 while also taking courses at the Jazz School Lucerne. In 1993 he attended Berklee College of Music in Boston where he graduated four years later and relocated to New York in May 2000 where he still lives today. Besides touring around the world with various projects since the late 1990s he has spent extended amounts of time in India, Brazil and China (Hong Kong).

His sideman work includes collaborations with Angélique Kidjo (US Oyaya! touring band from 2004-2006), Santana’s musical director and former Miles Davis bassist Benny Rietveld (various projects since 2005), Teodora Enache, Prasanna, Kofo The Wonderman (band member since 2007), KJ Denhert, Malika Zarra, Fantcha, the Mendes Brothers (João and Ramiro Mendes), the New York Gypsy All-Stars (touring the US, Brazil, Europe and Asia from 2011-2016), and participating on 15 album productions by blues/soul artist Tomás Doncker for True Groove Records since 2012.

Filtron M 

Koch’s own project Filtron M is a platform of a multi-national network of musicians and a compositional display of his extensive influences. The core idea of Filtron M goes back to the formation of his first group with Anat Cohen, Guilherme Monteiro, Gustavo Amarante and Harvey Wirht during his Boston years in the late 1990s. After Koch’s official debut album Triple Life (2011) he released the EP Mandatory Underground (2014) which introduces the initial members of Filtron M with Panagiotis Andreou and Patrick Andy on bass, Mauricio Zottarelli and Harvey Wirht on drums, and Sebastian Nickoll and Brahim Fribgane on percussion. The album Astoria Roots Live (2017) features additional guests with performances at Iridium in New York and at Moods in Zurich. Other musicians that have appeared with Filtron M in performances, videos or on recordings include Samuel Torres, Camila Meza, Gino Sitson and Kaïssa.

Discography

As leader/Filtron M

As sideman (selection)

References

External links

 Filtron M @ Drom NYC February 5th 2013
 Filtron M Blue Note NYC March 30th 2013
 Prasanna @ Terraza 7 December 3rd 2016
 Teodora Enache & Benny Rietveld Quintet in Bucharest September 19th 2014 on the website of the National Theatre Bucharest

Swiss jazz pianists
Berklee College of Music alumni
1972 births
Living people
Swiss composers
Swiss keyboardists
People from Baar, Switzerland
Swiss musicians
21st-century pianists